The women's 65 kg (143 lbs) Semi-Contact category at the W.A.K.O. World Championships 2007 in Coimbra was the third heaviest of the female Light-Contact tournaments being the equivalent of the light heavyweight division when compared to Full-Contact's weight classes. There were twelve women from three continents (Europe, Africa and North America) taking part in the competition.  Each of the matches was three rounds of two minutes each and were fought under Semi-Contact rules.

Due to there not being enough fighters for a tournament designed for sixteen, four of the women had byes through to the quarter final stage.  The tournament winner was Germany's Melanie Moder who defeated Italy's Chiara Leonardi in the final by points decision to claim gold.  Defeated semi finalists, Ina Grindheim from Norway and Lorraine Hughes from Great Britain, claimed the bronze medal positions.

Results

Key

See also
List of WAKO Amateur World Championships
List of WAKO Amateur European Championships
List of female kickboxers

References

External links
 WAKO World Association of Kickboxing Organizations Official Site

Kickboxing events at the WAKO World Championships 2007 Coimbra
2007 in kickboxing
Kickboxing in Portugal